

Molthi

"Molthi" (मोल्ठी), a small village of Brahmins in Pauri Garhwal District in the state of Uttarakhand which is fairly illustrious for the holy temple of "Lord Nadbudh Bhairava" (श्री नादबुद्ध भैरव).

About the ‘Nadbudh Bhairava Temple’

Molthi's Bhairava Temple is an open boat of worship for all men and women, from all walks of life and probably one of the leading temples of Bhairava one can notice in the sprinkled villages in the mountainous landscape of Uttrakhand. “Lord Nadbudh Bhairava” is prevalently identified as ‘Molthi’s Bhairon’ (म्वल्ठिऊ भैरौं) or ‘Mamgain’s Bhairon’ (Mamgain भैरों). “Shri Nadbudh Bhairava” is the family deity of the inhabitants of ‘Molthi’ (i.e. Mamgain's – ममगाँई) who used to call him ‘Teen Dhurpali’ or ‘Bhairava Nath Thakurji’. He is considered to be calm deity of the area. 
      
Although, the worshipers often come to the temple for routine worship at different occasions, but the temple attracts pilgrims the most for the worship organized in the month of June 10 every year wherein the involvement of worshipers is remarkable. Besides the local inhabitants of ‘Molthi’ all others who know about the “Temple of Shri. Nadbudh Bhairava” come to have the blessings of Shri. Nadbudh Bhairava.

The worship in the month of June 10 takes place in a collective manner in which every pilgrim who visits the temple on the day gets automatically participated in it. The worship usually starts early sunup on the Annual Worship Day of June 10 after Keertan-bhajan samaroh (Prayer Ceremony) in preceding 3 to 7 days. More than half a dozen Priests recite the Hymns of different God and Goddess, out of which the main Priests sits on the Chajja (projecting or overhanging eaves or cover of a roof, usually supported on large carved brackets) of the Temple. Under the canopy over the Chajja, the Sphatic- Linga (गंथर) of Shri. Nadbudh Bhairava is placed which is the initial symbol to recognize and worship the Bhairava. Sphatic is a quality of Marbal like stone. The worship continues till 4 p.m. The Temple also serves a langar (simple vegetarian meal) to all visitors that begins around 10 a.m. and gets ended around 2-3 p.m. For the darshan (visit) of Bhairava, pilgrims go to the main gate of the Temple, worship there, and after getting the Prasadam (a devotional offering made to God, typically consisting of food that is later shared among devotees), complete the Parikrama (ritual walkabout) of the Temple, thereafter they take immense pleasure in seeing the statues of other God and Goddess accommodated in other cabin of the Temple. On that day, Pilgrims also enjoy the ‘fair’ which is locally referred to as ‘10 June ka mela’, organized by the ‘Bhairava Temple Samiti’. The neighborhood hawkers and villagers open stalls in the adjoining area of the Temple. The occasion also notices the conventional recitation prayer in the beginning wherein the Drummers use to beat their hanging drum, which happens to be smaller in size and locally called ‘damoun’, by two equal size sticks. And some of them beat one side of drum (dhol) by a stick and other side by fingers. The sound of bigger drum is, obviously, louder than smaller one. Each one of them has attained mastery in playing with his musical instrument. After the initial prayer, the Drummers, sing the story of Maharabharata and local songs in their traditional style with a Pandav Nirtya Tal in which in a circular form; fascinated devotees use to dance during Pandva Nirtya.

History of Nadbudh Bhairava Temple

Legends attribute that two Mamgain brothers (Sakal and Sumeru) were on high post with King Kanakpal (descendant of Ajaypal). These two Mamgain descendants are believed to have established the Nadbudh Bhairava Temple in the village Molthi. One of the two brothers settled in Molthi while the other one settled somewhere else. There are two "pitrakuda's" in the village of Molthi, one for the Mamgain's of Molthi and other one is for those Mamgain's, settled places other than Molthi.

Legends also attribute that Lord Nadbudh Bhairava was a Dhawadiya Deveta (God who speaks) of the region. At the time of Gorkha attack around 1790-1815, Bhairava alerted the villagers telling about the entry of Gorkhas in the area; resulting to which the villagers left the village on time. Thereafter, the Gorkhas got to the village and found nobody, they attacked the Bhairavnath Temple and the most awful act performed by them was that they put a filthy thing in fire and then threw it in the Temple. From that event Nadbudh Bhairava did’t remain as Dhawadiya. But the reliance of devotee's, pilgrims and followers of the Temple clearly indicates that the blessings of Bhairava remained same as earlier.

Staying Facility During the Annual Fair

The villagers of Molthi are in the habit of greeting most of the outsider pilgrims to stay in their house as they feel privileged in attending the pilgrims. Some pilgrims are also accommodated in the Dharmshala (rest place for pilgrims) of the Temple erected below the courtyard of the Temple for humane stay of the pilgrims who desire to stay there.

Transport

The village Molthi is well connected through road. The nearest railway station is at Kotdwar which is about 234 km from Delhi, National Capital of India. From Kotdwar, on the main high way “Kotdwar – Pauri” Marg, at a distance of about 90 km, the local bus stand of Paidul comes, from there, one has to take a turn to the sub-road connecting Paidul-Uregi-Shrikot. Molthi is at a mere distance of 3 km from Paidul.

References

Villages in Pauri Garhwal district